Gottfried Dienst (Basel, 9 September 1919 – Bern, 1 June 1998) was a Swiss association football referee. He was mostly known as the referee of the 1966 FIFA World Cup Final.

Dienst is one of only four men to have twice refereed a European Cup final, which he did in 1961 and 1965, and one of only two (the other being the Italian Sergio Gonella) to have refereed both the European Championship and the World Cup finals. He refereed the original 1968 European Championship final, which ended in a 1–1 draw between Italy and Yugoslavia. The final was replayed two days later; refereed by the Spaniard José María Ortiz de Mendíbil, the Italians won 2–0.

References

Gottfried Dienst

1919 births
1998 deaths
Swiss football referees
FIFA World Cup Final match officials
1966 FIFA World Cup referees
1962 FIFA World Cup referees
UEFA Euro 1968 referees
UEFA European Championship final referees